The United States's Bowline nuclear test series was a group of 47 nuclear tests conducted in 1968–1969. These tests followed the Operation Crosstie series and preceded the Operation Mandrel series.

References

Explosions in 1968
Explosions in 1969
1968 in military history
1969 in military history
Bowline
1968 in the United States
1969 in the United States